Andre Jules Dubus II (August 11, 1936 – February 24, 1999) was an American short story writer and essayist.

Biography

Early life and education
Andre Jules Dubus II was born in Lake Charles, Louisiana, the youngest child of Katherine (Burke) and André Jules Dubus, a Cajun-Irish Catholic family. His two elder siblings are Kathryn and Beth.  James Lee Burke is his first cousin.  His surname is pronounced "Duh-BYOOSE", with the accent falling on the second syllable, as in "profuse". Dubus grew up in the Bayou country in Lafayette, Louisiana, and was educated by the Christian Brothers, a Catholic religious order that emphasized literature and writing. Dubus graduated from nearby McNeese State College in 1958 as a journalism and English major. Dubus then spent six years in the Marine Corps, eventually  rising to the rank of captain. At this time he married his first wife and started a family. After leaving the Marine Corps, Dubus moved with his wife and four children to Iowa City, where he later graduated from the University of Iowa's Iowa Writers' Workshop with an MFA in creative writing, studying under Richard Yates. The family then moved to Haverhill, Massachusetts, where Dubus would spend the bulk of his academic career teaching literature and creative writing at Bradford College. He admired Hemingway, Chekhov, and Cheever.

Personal difficulties
Dubus's life was marked by several tragedies. His daughter was raped as a young woman, causing Dubus many years of paranoia over his loved ones' safety. Dubus carried personal firearms to protect himself and those around him, until the night in the late 1980s, when he almost shot a man who was in a drunken argument with his son, Andre, outside a bar in Haverhill, Massachusetts.

Dubus was seriously injured in a car accident on the night of July 23, 1986. He was driving from Boston to his home in Haverhill, Massachusetts, and he stopped to assist two disabled motorists—brother and sister Luis and Luz Santiago. As Dubus assisted the injured Luz to the side of the highway, an oncoming car swerved and hit them. Luis was killed instantly; Luz survived because Dubus had pushed her out of the way. Dubus was critically injured and both his legs were crushed. After a series of unsuccessful operations, his right leg was amputated above the knee, and he eventually lost the use of his left leg. Dubus spent three years undergoing a series of painful operations and extensive physical therapy.

To help Dubus with mounting medical bills, his friends and fellow writers Ann Beattie, E.L. Doctorow, John Irving, Gail Godwin, Stephen King, John Updike, Kurt Vonnegut, and Richard Yates held a special literary benefit in Boston and raised $86,000.

Despite his efforts to walk with a prosthesis, chronic infections confined him to a wheelchair for the remainder of his life, and he battled clinical depression as a result of his condition. Over the course of these struggles Dubus's third wife left him, taking with her their two young daughters.

Final years
Dubus eventually continued to write after his accident and produced two books of essays—including Broken Vessels, which became a finalist for the Pulitzer Prize—and a collection of short stories. Dubus also conducted a weekly writers' workshop in his home.

Dubus spent his later years in Haverhill, until his death from a heart attack in 1999, age 62. He is buried in Greenwood Cemetery, near his home in Haverhill, Massachusetts.

Legacy
Andre Dubus was married three times and fathered six children. His son Andre Dubus III is also an author; his most noted book is the novel House of Sand and Fog (1999), which was both a finalist for the National Book Award and the basis for an Academy Award-nominated film of the same title. In 2011, Andre Dubus III published a memoir of his life, Townie, which tells of growing up in Haverhill and deals extensively with his relationship with his father and the impoverished conditions faced by his mother and siblings after Dubus left the family for a student.

Dubus was the subject of an essay by Kacey Kowars entitled "A Celebration of Words," and was also paid tribute to in Andre Dubus: Memoirs,  a book edited by Kowars and featuring authors such as James Lee Burke, Andre Dubus II, and Andre Dubus III.

Xavier Review Press has published several scholarly titles on Dubus, including a special issue of Xavier Review on both Dubus and his son. In 2001, the press released Andre Dubus: Tributes edited by Donald Anderson, and in 2003 Leap of the Heart: Andre Dubus Talking edited by Ross Gresham.

Professor Olivia Carr Edenfield edited Conversations with Andre Dubus (University Press of Mississippi, 2013) and is the author of the critical monograph Understanding Andre Dubus (University of South Carolina Press, 2017.

Writing career
Although he did write one novel, The Lieutenant (1967), Dubus considered himself primarily a writer of short stories and novellas. Throughout his career, he published most of his work in small, distinguished literary journals such as Ploughshares and Sewanee Review, though he also placed stories in magazines such as The New Yorker and Playboy. Dubus remained loyal to a small publishing firm run by David R. Godine that published his first works. When larger book publishers approached him with more lucrative deals, Dubus stayed with Godine, switching only to Alfred A. Knopf towards the end of his career to assist with medical bills.

Dubus's collections and novellas include: Separate Flights (1975), Adultery and Other Choices (1977), Finding a Girl in America (1980), The Times Are Never So Bad (1983), Voices from the Moon (1984), The Last Worthless Evening (1986), Selected Stories (1988), Broken Vessels (1991), Dancing After Hours (1996), and Meditations from a Movable Chair (1998). Several writing awards are named after Dubus. His papers are archived at McNeese State University and Xavier University in Louisiana and at the Harry Ransom Humanities Research Center at the University of Texas in Austin.

Italian writer and editor Nicola Manuppelli has translated six collections of short stories and novellas by Dubus for Italian publisher Mattioli 1885: "Separate Flights" ("Voli separati"), "The Times Are Never So Bad" ("I tempi non sono mai così cattivi"), "Voices From The Moon" ("Voci dalla luna"), "We Don't Live Here Anymore" ("Non abitiamo più qui"), "Finding a girl in America" ("Il padre d'inverno") "Dancing After Hours" ("Ballando a notte fonda"). For the publication of these works,  Manuppelli has included introductions or afterwords by several American authors, including Dennis Lehane, Peter Orner, and Tobias Wolff, among others.

In 2017, work began at David R. Godine, Publishers to gather together all of the fiction Dubus released with his longtime and loyal publisher between the mid-1970s and late 1980s. The three-volume collected short stories and novellas was conceived of by series editor Joshua Bodwell and is made up of six of Dubus's previous books, two books per volume, plus previously uncollected stories in volume three. The project was a thorough re-launch of the master's work: for the first time since Dubus's stories were originally published by Godine, all of the interior pages were re-set and re-designed; all new cover photographs were commissioned from Greta Rybus; the paperback originals were given handsome French flaps; and new, original introductions by Ann Beattie, Richard Russo, and Tobias Wolff were commissioned. All three volumes were published in 2018.

Cinematic adaptations
After Dubus's death, his story "Killings" was adapted into Todd Field's In the Bedroom (2001) starring Sissy Spacek, Tom Wilkinson, and Marisa Tomei. The film was nominated for five Academy Awards – Best Picture, Actor in a Leading Role (Wilkinson), Actress in a Leading Role (Spacek), Actress in a Supporting Role (Tomei), and Best Writing, Screenplay Based on Material Previously Published (Robert Festinger & Field).

The 2004 movie We Don't Live Here Anymore is based upon two of Dubus's novellas, "We Don't Live Here Anymore" and "Adultery."

Awards and honors

 Fellowships from the Guggenheim and MacArthur Foundations
 L.L. Winship/PEN New England Award (for debut collection Separate Flights) (1975)
 Jean Stein Award from the American Academy of Arts and Letters (1988)
 PEN/Malamud Award for Excellence in the Short Story  (1991)
 Pulitzer Prize, Finalist (for nonfiction, Broken Vessels) (1992)
 Rea Award for the Short Story (1996)
 National Book Critics Circle Award, Finalist (for fiction, Dancing After Hours) (1996)

Bibliography
 The Lieutenant (Novel, 1967, Dial Press)
 Separate Flights (Stories, 1975, David R. Godine, Publisher)
 Adultery & Other Choices (Stories, 1977, David R. Godine, Publisher) (Reprint, David R. Godine Publisher, 1999) 
 Finding a Girl in America (Stories, 1980, David R. Godine, Publisher)
 The Times Are Never So Bad (Stories, 1983, David R. Godine, Publisher)
 Voices from the Moon (Novella, 1984, David R. Godine, Publisher)
 The Last Worthless Evening (Stories, 1986, David R. Godine, Publisher)
 Selected Stories (Stories, 1988, David R. Godine, Publisher) (Reprint, Vintage, 1996) 
 Broken Vessels (Essays, 1991, David R. Godine, Publisher) (Reprint, Vintage, 1992)
 Dancing After Hours (Stories, 1996, Knopf)
 Meditations from a Moveable Chair (Essays, 1998, Knopf)
 In the Bedroom (Stories, 2001, Vintage) (Selected and with a foreword by Todd Field) 
 We Don't Live Here Anymore: Collected Short Stories & Novellas, Volume 1 (Stories, 2018, David R. Godine, Publisher) (Introduction by Ann Beattie)
 The Winter Father: Collected Short Stories & Novellas, Volume 2 (Stories, 2018, David R. Godine, Publisher) (Introduction by Richard Russo)
 The Cross Country Runner: Collected Short Stories & Novellas, Volume 3 (Stories, 2018, David R. Godine, Publisher) (Introduction by Tobias Wolff)

Reviews
 Review of Voices from the Moon.

References

External links 

1936 births
1999 deaths
MacArthur Fellows
20th-century American memoirists
Iowa Writers' Workshop alumni
Writers from Lake Charles, Louisiana
American amputees
United States Marine Corps officers
McNeese State University alumni
20th-century American novelists
PEN/Malamud Award winners
American male novelists
American male essayists
American male short story writers
20th-century American short story writers
20th-century American essayists
20th-century American male writers
Novelists from Louisiana